"Don't Be Cruel" is a song that was recorded by Elvis Presley and written by Otis Blackwell in 1956.  It was inducted into the Grammy Hall of Fame in 2002.  In 2004, it was listed #197 in Rolling Stone's list of 500 Greatest Songs of All Time. The song is currently ranked as the 173rd greatest song of all time, as well as the sixth best song of 1956, by Acclaimed Music.

Elvis Presley

Recording
"Don't Be Cruel" was the first song that Presley's song publishers, Hill & Range, brought to him to record. Blackwell was more than happy to give up 50% of the royalties and a co-writing credit to Presley to ensure that the "hottest new singer around covered it". But unfortunately he had already sold the song for only $25, as he stated in an interview of American Songwriter.

Freddy Bienstock, Presley's music publisher, gave the following explanation for why Presley received co-writing credit for songs like "Don't Be Cruel". "In the early days Elvis would show dissatisfaction with some lines and he would make alterations, so it wasn't just what is known as a 'cut-in'. His name did not appear after the first year. But if Presley liked the song, the writers would be offered a guarantee of a million records and they would surrender a third of their royalties to Elvis'."

Presley recorded the song on July 2, 1956, during an exhaustive recording session at RCA studios in New York City. During this session he also recorded "Hound Dog", and "Any Way You Want Me". The song featured Presley's regular band of Scotty Moore on lead guitar (with Presley usually providing rhythm guitar), Bill Black on double bass, D. J. Fontana on drums, and backing vocals from the Jordanaires. The producing credit was given to RCA's Stephen H. Sholes, although the studio recordings reveal that Presley produced the songs in this session by selecting the song, reworking the arrangement on piano, and insisting on 28 takes before he was satisfied with it. He also ran through 31 takes of "Hound Dog".

Release
The single was released on July 13, 1956, backed with "Hound Dog". Within a few weeks "Hound Dog" had risen to #2 on the Pop charts with sales of over one million. Soon after it was overtaken by "Don't Be Cruel" which took #1 on all three main charts; Pop, Country, and R'n'B. Between them, both songs remained at #1 on the Pop chart for a run of 11 weeks tying it with the 1950 Anton Karas hit "The Third Man Theme" and the 1951–1952 Johnnie Ray hit "Cry" for the longest stay at number one by a single record from late 1950 onward until 1992's smash "End of the Road" by Boyz II Men. By the end of 1956 it had sold in excess of four million copies. Billboard ranked it as the No. 2 song for 1956.

Presley performed "Don't Be Cruel" during all three of his appearances on The Ed Sullivan Show in September 1956 and January 1957.

In the UK, it remained a B-side, but was posthumously a hit in its own right, reaching number 24 in the UK Singles Chart in 1978, a year after Presley's death.

Legacy

"Don't Be Cruel" went on to become Presley's biggest selling single recorded in 1956, with sales over six million by 1961. It became a regular feature of his live sets until his death in 1977, and was often coupled with "Jailhouse Rock" or "(Let Me Be Your) Teddy Bear" during performances from 1969.

Personnel
 Elvis Presley – lead vocals, percussion
 Scotty Moore – lead guitar
 Bill Black – double bass
 D. J. Fontana – drums
 Shorty Long – piano
 The Jordanaires (Gordon Stoker, Neal Matthews, Hoyt Hawkins, Hugh Jarrett) – backing vocals

Certifications

The Beatles versions
According to author Mark Lewisohn in The Complete Beatles Chronicles (p. 362) the Beatles performed it live from about 1959 to 1961, though no recording is known to survive. The band did record a laid-back version during the massive 1969 Get Back sessions, but it has never been released. However ex-Beatles John Lennon, Ringo Starr, Pete Best and Lennon's former bandmembers the Quarrymen as well as Tony Sheridan all later recorded versions of it.

Other versions
Many other artists including Connie Francis (1959, Rock 'n' Roll Million Sellers), Annette Peacock, Barbara Lynn (1963, Jamie #1244 45 RPM, #93 on the Hot 100), Bill Black's Combo, Billy Swan, Devo, Cheap Trick, Daffy Duck, Merle Haggard, Jerry Lee Lewis, Neil Diamond,  and Jackie Wilson have recorded the song. Presley was said to be so impressed with Wilson's version that he would later incorporate many of Wilson's mannerisms into future performances.
Debbie Harry of Blondie recorded the song for the Otis Blackwell tribute album Brace Yourself! A Tribute to Otis Blackwell. A cover by American country music duo the Judds peaked at number 10 on the Billboard Hot Country Singles chart in 1987. Cheap Trick's version of this song, the second single released from the band's tenth studio album Lap of Luxury, reached No. 4 on the Billboard Hot 100 for two weeks in October 1988.

Jonathan Rhys Meyers lip-synched the original version of the song in a scene from Elvis, where it shows him performing at the Jacksonville Theater.

Chart positions

Bill Black's Combo

Billy Swan

Year-end charts

The Judds

Cheap Trick

Year-end charts

References

External links
 BBC – Desert Island Discs – Castaway : Suzi Quatro (Adobe Flash or MP3) at BBC (streamed copy where licensed). Desert Island Discs is a radio programme in which guest castaways choose eight records to take with them to a mythical desert island. Quatro's first choice is "Don't Be Cruel" (at time 2:04) 
 "American Songwriter Otis Blackwells Triumph"

1956 singles
1975 singles
1988 singles
Songs written by Otis Blackwell
Elvis Presley songs
Billy Swan songs
Cheap Trick songs
The Judds songs
John Lennon songs
Jerry Lee Lewis songs
Neil Diamond songs
Jackie Wilson songs
Billboard Top 100 number-one singles
Grammy Hall of Fame Award recipients
Song recordings produced by Richie Zito
RCA Victor singles
Curb Records singles
Epic Records singles
Rockabilly songs
1956 songs
Song recordings produced by Stephen H. Sholes